Ignacy Żagiell (Lithuanian: Ignotas Žagelis) (14 February 1826, Pavirinčiai, Anykščiai district, Lithuania - 21 June 1891, Warsaw or Vilnius) was a physician, traveler and Polish-language writer, descended from Lithuanian nobility.

Life

Żagiell served as an army physician in Great Britain from 1859, and as a civilian physician in Turkey from 1864.

He travelled in India, Egypt and the Near East.

Notable works
 Historja starożytnego Egiptu (History of Ancient Egypt, 1880);
 Podróż historyczna po Abissynii, Adel, Szoa, Nubii, u źródeł Nilu, z opisaniem jego wodospadów, oraz po krajach podrównikowych; do Mekki i Medyny, Syryi i Palestyny, Konstantynopolu i po Archipelagu (1884; reprint published in 2012; some of the descriptions in this book are probably not authentic).

See also
 Pharaoh (novel, by Bolesław Prus, which drew from Żagiell's History of Ancient Egypt).

References
 Ignotas Žagelis
 
 
 

Polish male writers
Polish military doctors
1826 births
1891 deaths